Kings Canyon is a canyon in the Northern Territory of Australia located at the western end of the George Gill Range  about  southwest of Alice Springs and about  south of Darwin within the Watarrka National Park.

Description 

The walls of Kings Canyon are over 100 metres high, with Kings Creek at the bottom.  Part of the gorge is a sacred Aboriginal site and visitors are discouraged from leaving the walking tracks.

Three walks exist at Kings Canyon.  The two km (return) and approximately one-hour Kings Creek Walk traces the bottom of the gorge.  At the end of the walk is a platform, with views of the canyon walls above.  The six km (loop) Kings Canyon Rim Walk traces the top of the canyon and takes three to four hours to complete.  A steep climb at the beginning of the walk, which locals call "Heartbreak Hill" (or "Heart Attack Hill", due to its steepness), takes visitors up to the top, with views of the gorge below and of the surrounding landscape. About half way during the walk, a detour descends to the Garden of Eden, a permanent waterhole surrounded by plant life.  The last half of the walk passes through a maze of weathered sandstone domes, reminiscent of the Bungle Bungle.  A slow descent brings the visitor back to the starting point.  The loop can also be done in reverse (anti-clockwise), but the National Park Rangers encourage visitors to walk in one direction.  Access to the walk may be restricted during hot weather. The 22 km Giles Track connects Kings Canyon to Kathleen Springs and is popular with more adventurous hikers.

Birds that can be seen on the Kings Canyon Rim walk include spinifex pigeon, zebra finch, grey-headed honeyeater, dusky grasswren, black-breasted buzzard and peregrine falcon.

Kings Canyon Solar Power Station was a photovoltaic power station in the Northern Territory, with a generating capacity of 225 kWp and electricity production of 372,000 kWh of electricity per annum.  It was the largest single installation of its kind in Australia and began operation in December 2003. It has been shut down since December 2015 due to the local tourist resort installing its own generators.

Geology 
According to geologists, the valley was formed more than 400 million years ago. It cuts through a layer of Mereenie Sandstone, which was deposited here 400 million years ago. The sandstone can be viewed in the form of 30-m high cliffs, and as you go deeper, you can witness the softer Carmichael Sandstone, which has been present here for 440 million years. These two layers of sandstone are divided by a thin layer of purple shale or mudstone which depicts the environmental changes between the two formations.

References

External links

 Kings Creek Station

Canyons and gorges in the Northern Territory